Limited Collector's Edition is a compilation of single and album tracks recorded by Glen Campbell between 1962 and 1970.

Track listing
Side 1:
 "Together Again" (Buck Owens) - 2:17
 "Dreams of the Everyday Housewife" (Chris Gantry) - 2:30
 "Mary In The Morning" (John Cymbal, Mike Lendell) - 3:00
 "Too Late To Worry, Too Blue To Cry" (Al Dexter) - 2:30
 "Arkansas" (Mitch Torok, Ramona Redd) - 2:36
 "Less of Me" (Glen Campbell) - 2:35
 "Fate of Man" (Glen Campbell) - 2:38

Side 2:
 "If You Go Away" (Jacques Brel, Rod McKuen) - 3:37
 "The Impossible Dream" (Joe Darion, Mitch Leigh, Andrew Scott) - 2:44
 "Tomorrow Never Comes" (Ernest Tubb, Johnny Bond) - 2:25
 "My Baby's Gone" (Hazel Houser) - 2:55
 "Love Me As Though There Were No Tomorrow" (Jimmy McHugh, Harold Adamson) - 2:38
 "Once More With Feeling" (Shirley Nelson) - 3:16
 "Friends" (Glen Campbell, Dick Bowman) - 2:33

Production
Producers - Al De Lory/Nick Venet
Arranged and conducted by Al De Lory, Jimmy Haskell, Marty Paich, Leon Russell
A & R coordinator - Pete Klein
Liner notes - Todd Everett
Jacket design - Jack Purtle

Albums produced by Nick Venet
1970 compilation albums
Glen Campbell compilation albums
Capitol Records compilation albums